Liam O'Brien (March 7, 1913 – March 24, 1996) was an American screenwriter and television producer best known for writing the movie Here Comes the Groom.

Life and career
O'Brien was educated at Fordham and Manhattan College. He had been a poet, a cartoonist and labor organizer before World War II, when he served in the Signal Corps. After the war, he headed to Hollywood, where his younger brother Edmond O'Brien was already an established star. He became an overnight success six years later when his first screenplay, the romantic comedy Here Comes the Groom, with Bing Crosby and Jane Wyman, earned him an Oscar nomination in 1951.

The following year, his play The Remarkable Mr. Pennypacker became a Broadway hit featuring Burgess Meredith. This romantic comedy was filmed by 20th Century Fox in 1959 with Clifton Webb in the title role. The play remains popular in amateur theatres, partly because there are so many roles to be filled:  the industrialist Mr. Pennypacker is a loveable bigamist with 17 children.

His widow, Claudette O'Brien, claimed Pennypacker was based on the actual double life of an O'Brien relative – one who "laughed louder than anyone on opening night".

O'Brien collapsed in his wife's arms and died of a heart attack at his Los Angeles home at age 83.

His son, Devin Liam O' Brien, has been an associate producer of the Academy Award television broadcast.

Filmography

Writer
 Chain Lightning (1950)
 Of Men and Music (1951)
 The Redhead and the Cowboy (1951)
 Here Comes the Groom (1951)
 Diplomatic Courier (1952)
 The Stars Are Singing (1953)
 Young at Heart (1955)
 Lux Video Theatre (1 episode, 1956)
 Trapeze (1956)
 The Remarkable Mr. Pennypacker (1959)
 The Great Impostor (1961)
 The Devil at 4 O'Clock (1961)
 Rex Harrison Presents Stories of Love (1974)
 Gibbsville (1 episode, 1976)
 Police Story (1 episode, 1977)
 The Awakening Land (1974)

Producer
 Police Story (Unknown episodes)
 The Mississippi (Unknown episodes)
 Miami Vice (4 episodes, 1985–1986)

Awards and nominations

References

External links
 

1913 births
1996 deaths
Writers from Manhattan
American male screenwriters
American television writers
Television producers from New York City
Manhattan College alumni
American male television writers
20th-century American businesspeople
Screenwriters from New York (state)
20th-century American male writers
20th-century American screenwriters